Irena Wanda Jarocka (18 August 1946 – 21 January 2012), was a Polish singer.

Career

Education
Jarocka was born in Srebrna Góra, Poland. She graduated from the V Liceum Ogólnokształcące im. Stefana Żeromskiego, and the faculty of music studies at Średnia Szkoła Muzyczna in Gdańsk, studying under professor Halina Mickiewiczówna. She later graduated from a Faculty of Biology at a teachers' college.  Between 1969 and 1973 she lived in Paris on a scholarship, studying at Le Petit Conservatoire de la Chanson.

Music
Jarocka participated in amateur singing competitions, and worked with Zespół Estradowy Marynarki Wojennej Flotylla. In 1966, at 20 years old, she debuted at Klub Rudy Kot in Gdańsk, and first participated in the Krajowy Festiwal Piosenki Polskiej in Opole. She also performed at the Sopot Festival. She recorded albums for the Philips label and performed in concerts with Michel Sardou, Enrico Macias, Charles Aznavour, and Mireille Mathieu. She sang outside Poland, in such countries as Germany, Bulgaria, Switzerland, Italy, Portugal, Luxembourg, Australia and France, and for Polish communities in the US and Canada. She worked with Polanie, Czerwone Gitary, Budka Suflera, and Exodus.)

Film and television
Jarocka acted with Andrzej Kopiczyński in the film adaptation of Motylem jestem, czyli romans 40-latka (I am a butterfly, or a 40-year-old's romance), scripted and directed by Jerzy Gruza and Krzysztof Teodor Toeplitz. In the film Jarocka sang her own songs, including "Motylem jestem" ("I am a butterfly") and "Po prostu człowiek" ("Simply a human").

Her performances and programs were recorded for Telewizja Polska stations in Gdańsk, Łódź, Poznań, Wrocław, Katowice, and Warsaw, including Irena Jarocka zaprasza (Irena Jarocka Invites You), Irena Jarocka i jej goście (Irena Jarocka and Guests), Spotkanie z gwiazdą (A Meeting with a Star), Mężczyzna na niepogodę (Man for Bad Weather), Największe przeboje Ireny Jarockiej (Biggest Hits of Irena Jarocka), Zwariowany dzień (A Crazy Day), and Bo wszystko jest piosenką francuską (Because Everything is a French Song). She also took part in Muzyka łączy pokolenia (Music Connects Generations) on TVP3.
 
In 2006, in the US, she took part in the Amerykańskie Rozmowy w toku (American Conversations) with Ewa Drzyzga. The show dealt with famous Poles trying to make a living abroad.

About 
From 1990 she lived in the United States with her second husband Michał Sobolewski , whom she married in 1989 while being in relationship from 1976 for 35 years till her last day. Her daughter with Sobolewski, Monika Sobolewska was born in Poland in 1982 and graduated from Texas Tech University in art-communication design. Jarocka was performing continuously in the States and European countries. Her first marriage, to Marian Zacharewicz, was dissolved. She maintained continuous ties with her public in Poland while living periodically in Warsaw during her frequent concert tours there. In 2007, she published an autobiographical novel, Motylem jestem, czyli piosenka o mnie samej. She died, aged 65, in Warsaw, from brain cancer.

Awards
 1968: First place – Telewizyjna Giełda Piosenki with song "Gondolierzy znad Wisły" (Gondoliers from Vistula)
 1971: Silver Gronostaj Award – Festival in Rennes, for music interpretation
 1973: Silver Ring award – FPŻ in Kołobrzeg, with song "Ballada o żołnierzu, któremu udało się powrócić" (Ballad of a soldier, who manager to return)
 1974: Audience Award – International Song Festival in Sopot
 1975: Silver Nail of 1974 – Number 1 popularity award by readers of the "Kurier Polski (dziennik popołudniowy)"
 1975: Second place – Coupe d’Europe Musicale in Villach, Austria
 1976: Silver Nail of 1975 – Number 1 popularity award by readers of the "Kurier Polski (dziennik popołudniowy)"
 1976: Special mention – Festival in Tokyo, Japan, for song "Odpływają kawiarenki" (Cafes are floating away)
 1977: Silver Nail of 1976 – Number 1 popularity award by readers of the "Kurier Polski (dziennik popołudniowy)"
 1978: Special mention – Festival in Palma de Mallorca, for song "Wymyśliłam cię" (I made you up)
 1978: Second place – Festival in Drezno, Germany, for song "Mój słodki Charlie" (My sweet Charlie)
 1978: Special mention – Festival in Limassol, Cyprus
 1979: Silver Nail of 1978 – Number 1 popularity award by readers of the "Kurier Polski (dziennik popołudniowy)"

Discography

Albums
 1974 – W cieniu dobrego drzewa, re-edition 2001
 1976 – Gondolierzy znad Wisły, re-edition 2001
 1977 – Wigilijne życzenie, re-edition 2001
 1977 – Koncert
 1978 – Być narzeczoną twą, re-edition 2001
 1981 – Irena Jarocka
 1987 – Irena Jarocka II
 1992 – My French favorites
 2001 – Mój wielki sen
 2004 – Kolędy bez granic
 2008 – Małe rzeczy
 2010 – Ponieważ znów są Święta
 2012 – Piosenki francuskie

Singles
 1969 – Il faut y croire/Tu me reviendras
 1970 – Tant que la barque va/Et ce sera moi
 1974 – Śpiewam pod gołym niebem/Wymyśliłam Cię/Nie wrócą te lata/W cieniu dobrego drzewa
 1975 – Junge Liebe/Warum weint der Wind
 1975 – Kocha się raz/Zawsze pójdę z tobą
 1976 – Sag ihm, das ich ihn liebe/Auf dem Bahnsteig Nr 8
 1976 – Odpływają kawiarenki/Przeczucie
 1976 – Sto lat czekam na twój list/By coś zostało z tych dni
 1977 – Morgenrot/Unser Zelt aus Stroh
 1978 – Garść piasku/Chyba się warto o mnie bić
 1978 – Niech tańczą nasze serca/Mój słodki Charlie
 1978 – Nie wiadomo, który dzień/Wszystko dam
 1978 – Być narzeczoną twą/Przeoczone, zawinione
 1978 – Nadzieja/Był ktoś
 1979 – Piosenka spod welonu/Mon Harley Davidson/Plaisir d'amour/Aranjuez mon amour
 1980 – To za mało/Nie odchodź jeszcze
 1981 – Tańczy niedziela/Gimmie some lovin
 1981 – Mam temat na życie/Bliski sercu dzień
 2001 – Magia księżyca/Dance remix Motylem jestem, Kawiarenki, Nie wrócą te lata
 2002 – Na krakowską nutę – duo with Wawele group
 2008 – Małe rzeczy
 2009 – No to co
 2010 – Break Free – duo with Michael Bolton
 2010 – Ponieważ znów są Święta

Compilation albums
 1995 – Wielkie przeboje
 1995 – Kolekcja vol.1
 1995 – Kolekcja vol.2
 1998 – Odpływają kawiarenki – Złota kolekcja
 2002 – Złote przeboje – Platynowa kolekcja
 2003 – Motylem jestem
 2006 – Moje złote przeboje – Platynowa kolekcja
 2006 – Piosenki o miłości – Platynowa kolekcja
 2010 – Największe przeboje część 1
 2010 – Największe przeboje część 2
 2011 – 40 piosenek Ireny Jarockiej

References

Sources
 Wolański, Ryszard (1995); Leksykon Polskiej Muzyki Rozrywkowej, pp. 78–79, Agencja Wydawnicza MOREX;

External links

 
 Irena Jarocka profile Filmpolski.pl; accessed 2 October 2014 (in Polish)
 Irena Jarocka entry, Katalog Polskich Płyt Gramofonowych; accessed 2 October 2014 (in Polish)
 Official website; accessed 2 October 2014 (in Polish)

1946 births
2012 deaths
Polish expatriates in the United States
People from Wągrowiec County
Polish women singers
Deaths from brain cancer in Poland